Yair González (born 21 March 2002) is an Argentine professional footballer who plays as a midfielder for Argentinos Juniors.

Club career
González broke through into first-team football with Chacarita Juniors in 2018–19. He was initially an unused substitute for Primera B Nacional fixtures with Mitre and Deportivo Morón, before appearing for his senior bow on 23 February 2019 against Sarmiento; playing twenty-two minutes of a home loss, having come on in place of Joaquín Ibáñez. After not turning up to Chacarita's virtual training during the COVID-19 pandemic, the club confirmed on 24 November 2020, that they had terminated the players contract.

Subsequently, there were several rumors that González had signed with Chilean club Unión La Calera.

International career
In August 2017, González was called up by the Argentina U15s ahead of friendlies with their Paraguayan counterparts. He appeared in the first encounter on 7 August.

Career statistics
.

References

External links

2002 births
Living people
Place of birth missing (living people)
Argentine footballers
Argentine expatriate footballers
Argentina youth international footballers
Association football midfielders
Primera Nacional players
Chacarita Juniors footballers
Unión La Calera footballers
Argentinos Juniors footballers
Argentine expatriate sportspeople in Chile
Expatriate footballers in Chile